Shaw House is an important example of an early symmetrical H-plan Elizabethan mansion, located at Shaw, on the north-eastern outskirts of Newbury in Berkshire.

History

The manor house of Shaw, Shaw House was built by the wealthy cloth merchant, Thomas Dolman, and completed in 1581. It is famous for its reputation as King Charles I's headquarters during the Second Battle of Newbury. However recent research has proved that, despite being at the centre of the fighting, the King never went to the house. Other Royals have visited, most notably Elizabeth I. In the 1720s, it was acquired by the flamboyant James Brydges, 1st Duke of Chandos.  Although it was not the principal residence of the Duke, the family evidently spent some time in the area and the second Duke bought a wife at a sale in Newbury.

After the first Duke's death in 1744 the dowager duchess lived at Shaw House till her death in 1750. Her step-son sold the property soon afterwards to the Andrews family. It was the childhood home of the historian, James Pettit Andrews. For many years it was a school.

The house is currently owned and managed by West Berkshire Council as a conference venue and public attraction.

Restoration
Following a major restoration Shaw House opened to the public in 2008. It is also a conference venue and home to West Berkshire's Registration Service for Births, Deaths and Ceremonies. Work began in 2005 after the mansion was awarded more than £4m from the Heritage Lottery Fund. English Heritage and Vodafone also contributed to the £6m project.

Visitors can now enjoy a programme of events and activities whilst wandering the house and spending time in the exhibitions and family corner. The House is open most weekends and some school holidays.

References

External links
Shaw House - official site
West Berkshire Council: Shaw House
Royal Berkshire History: Shaw House
West Berkshire Council

Houses completed in 1581
Elizabethan architecture
Grade I listed buildings in Berkshire
Grade I listed houses
Country houses in Berkshire
West Berkshire District
Historic house museums in Berkshire
1581 establishments in England